Myxodagnus opercularis, the Dart stargazer, is a species of sand stargazer native to the coastal waters of Baja California Sur, Mexico where it can be found on sandy bottoms.

References

opercularis
Fish described in 1861